Alice Plantation House, also known as the Fuselier Plantation House, is a historic house in Jeanerette, Louisiana, U.S.. It was built in 1816 for the Fuselier family. It is listed on the National Register of Historic Places since June 14, 1984. The house was designed in the Creole architectural style. This plantation was worked by enslaved people.

History
The house was built near Baldwin in St. Martin Parish in 1816, for Agricole Fuselier de la Claire, the son of Gabriel Fuselier de la Claire, a large landowner whose first wife Jeanne was the daughter of Jacques Roman, the owner of the Oak Alley Plantation. Agricole Fuselier lived here with his wife, Christine Berard. He served as a lieutenant in the state militia, and he became a sugar planter. He owned slaves.

The house was moved near Jeanerette in Iberia Parish in 1961. By the 1980s, it still belonged to the Fuselier family.

See also 
 National Register of Historic Places listings in Iberia Parish, Louisiana

References

	
National Register of Historic Places in Iberia Parish, Louisiana
Houses completed in 1816